Central Station was an intercity passenger terminal in downtown Chicago, Illinois, at the southern end of Grant Park near Roosevelt Road and Michigan Avenue. Owned by the Illinois Central Railroad, it also served other companies via trackage rights. It opened in 1893, replacing Great Central Station (on the site of the current Millennium Station), and closed in 1972 when Amtrak rerouted services to Union Station. The station building was demolished in 1974.  It is now the site of a redevelopment called Central Station, Chicago.

Adjoining platforms at Roosevelt served the Illinois Central's suburban trains for both the Electric and West lines, in addition to the South Shore Line interurban railroad. All three lines continued north to Randolph Street.

History

Illinois Central 
The Romanesque Revival structure, designed by Bradford L. Gilbert and built by the Illinois Central Railroad, opened April 17, 1893 to meet the traffic demands of the World's Columbian Exposition. The nine-story building featured a 13-story clock tower and housed the general offices of the railroad. It boasted the largest train shed in the world at the time, which measured 140 by 610 feet.

Gremley & Bierdermann Inc. was contracted to provide land survey services and determine the boundary line configuration for the "Central Station Substation".

The station was built, owned and used by the Illinois Central Railroad for intercity trains, with connections to commuter trains and the South Shore Line across an adjacent bridge. It was also used by the Illinois Central's Chicago, Madison and Northern Railroad, merged into the IC in 1902, which reached the station via the St. Charles Air Line Railroad, meeting the IC main line just south of the station.

Also sharing the station was the Michigan Central Railroad, part of the New York Central Railroad system, which had shared the IC's terminal from its opening in 1852. The Michigan Central connected with the Illinois Central at Kensington. The Cleveland, Cincinnati, Chicago and St. Louis Railway (Big Four), also a New York Central line, joined the IC at Kankakee and also used Central Station. Using the station from the beginning was the Chicago and West Michigan Railway, consolidated into the Pere Marquette Railroad in 1900. At the time it used the Michigan Central west from New Buffalo, Michigan.

The Wisconsin Central Railway (part of the Minneapolis, St. Paul and Sault Ste. Marie Railway (Soo Line) after 1909) switched from Grand Central Station to Central in 1899 due to disagreements with the Chicago Terminal Transfer Railroad, which owned Grand Central. To get to Central it used a portion of the recently opened Chicago, Hammond and Western Railroad (later the Indiana Harbor Belt Railroad) from Franklin Park to Broadview, and the Illinois Central's Chicago, Madison and Northern Railroad from Broadview to the terminal. On December 15, 1903, the Pere Marquette Railroad's line to Porter, Indiana opened, and its trains were rerouted from Central to Grand Central.

The Soo Line switched back to Grand Central Station in 1912. On March 1, 1925 the Chesapeake and Ohio Railway began using Central, switching from Dearborn Station. Its new alignment used the allied New York, Chicago and St. Louis Railroad (Nickel Plate Road) from Hammond, Indiana north to Grand Crossing, Illinois, where it joined the Illinois Central to its terminal. In 1963 the Soo Line once again switched stations, moving back into Central for its final years of passenger service.

The New York Central Railroad moved its Michigan Central Railroad trains from Central to the NYC's LaSalle Street Station on January 18, 1957. The Illinois Central Railroad sued the Michigan Central, which had used the Illinois Central's Chicago terminal since 1852, for breach of contract, settling out of court for $5 million.

Amtrak 

By May 1, 1971, the startup date of Amtrak, Central was used only by trains of the Illinois Central Railroad (including the City of Miami, City of New Orleans and Panama Limited on the line south from Chicago, and the Hawkeye on the line to the west) and the Cleveland, Cincinnati, Chicago and St. Louis Railway (Big Four) (including the James Whitcomb Riley. Amtrak continued only the City of New Orleans, James Whitcomb Riley and moved the South Wind to Central Station as part of a rerouting on the Penn Central from former Pennsylvania trackage in Indiana to the former Big Four, as well as the IC's local Shawnee.

On January 23, 1972 Amtrak moved the Floridian (renamed from the South Wind in November 1971) to Union Station due to poor track conditions on its route in Indiana. The rest of the trains - the George Washington, James Whitcomb Riley, Panama Limited (temporarily renamed from the City of New Orleans, also in November 1971), and the Shawnee - last served Central Station March 5, 1972, after which they were rerouted to Union Station. The Panama Limited and Shawnee continued to use the IC to just south of Central Station, where they turned west onto the St. Charles Air Line as a realigned junction and ran west to Union Station, including at least one reversal to reach the station, a practice which continues today.

In late 1973, the Illinois Central relocated its general offices to the new Illinois Center. Demolition of Central Station and its train shed began on June 3, 1974. The commuter platforms remained until Spring 2009, serving the Metra Electric Line and NICTD's South Shore Line, when they were replaced with more modern structures and renamed Museum Campus/11th Street station. The railyards south of the station are the site of ongoing redevelopment as the Central Station project.

Services

Central Station was a terminal for the following lines and intercity trains:
Chesapeake and Ohio Railway (March 1, 1925 to ca. 1930s)
Cleveland, Cincinnati, Chicago and St. Louis Railway (Big Four)
Carolina Special to Asheville, Charlotte, and Charleston
James Whitcomb Riley to Cincinnati
Royal Palm and Ponce de Leon trains to Georgia and Florida
Illinois Central Railroad
City of Miami to Miami, Florida
City of New Orleans and Panama Limited to New Orleans, Louisiana
Diamond Special to St. Louis, Missouri
Hawkeye to Sioux Falls, South Dakota
Iowan to Sioux City, Iowa
Land O'Corn to Waterloo, Iowa
Seminole to Jacksonville, Florida
Shawnee to Carbondale, Illinois
Sinnissippi to Freeport, Iowa
Michigan Central Railroad (up to January 17, 1957)
Canadian to Montreal, Quebec, and later to Toronto, Ontario
Mercury to Detroit, Michigan, Cleveland, Ohio and Cincinnati, Ohio
North Shore Limited to New York City
Motor City Special to Detroit, Michigan
Niagara to New York City (cut back to Niagara Falls to NYC in 1940s)
Wolverine to New York City
Minneapolis, St. Paul and Sault Ste. Marie Railway (Soo Line) (1899 to 1912 and after 1965) 
Laker to Duluth, Minnesota
Pere Marquette Railroad (up to December 15, 1903)
Amtrak (through March 5, 1972)
Floridian
George Washington/James Whitcomb Riley
Panama Limited
Shawnee

The following commuter rail services operated through the station (southern line electrified after 1926) en route to Randolph Street Terminal (now Millennium Station) approximately 1.5 miles to the north:
Illinois Central Railroad - serving mostly local stops to South Chicago, Blue Island and Richton Park, later extended to University Park
Illinois Central Railroad - serving local stops to Addison (abandoned 1931)
Chicago South Shore and South Bend Railroad (beginning August 29, 1926) - interurban electric trains to South Bend, Indiana

The former Illinois Central electric commuter service is operated by Metra as its Electric Line and the former South Shore interurban is operated by the Northern Indiana Commuter Transportation District.

References

PRR Chronology

External links

Railway stations in Chicago
Central Chicago
Demolished buildings and structures in Chicago
Demolished railway stations in the United States
Former Amtrak stations in Illinois
Chicago
Chicago Central
Chicago Central
Former South Shore Line stations
Railway stations in the United States opened in 1893
Railway stations closed in 1972
Clock towers in Illinois
1893 establishments in Illinois
1972 disestablishments in Illinois
Chicago Central
Chicago Central
Romanesque Revival architecture in Illinois
Buildings and structures demolished in 1974